Studia Hibernica is an annual academic journal for Irish studies, including a wide spectrum of Irish language and literature, history, etymology and toponomy, archaeology and folklore. It was originally published annually by St Patrick's College, Drumcondra, Dublin, and is now issued by Dublin City University, into which St Patrick's merged, in co-operation with Liverpool University Press.

The journal was established in 1961 by members of St Patrick's Training College, Drumcondra, including Gearóid Mac Eoin, Dónall Cregan, Séamus Ó Mórdha, Breandán Mac Aodha and Tadhg Ó Ceallaigh. The journal is currently edited by Pauric Travers.

References 

Celtic studies
European studies journals
Annual journals
Multilingual journals
Dublin City University
Publications established in 1961
Irish history journals